Kağıthane is a rapid transit transfer complex on the M7 and M11 lines of the Istanbul Metro. The M7 platform located above ground on the metro viaducts crossing the Kağıthane Creek, while the M11 platform is in underground. The M7 platform of the complex opened in 28 October 2020, and the M11 platform opened in 22 January 2023.

Kağıthane station was originally planned to be completed in 2017, however construction delays pushed the opening back to first 2018 and then 2019. The complex is the first metro station within central Kağıthane.

Layout
M7 Platform

M11 Platform

References

Istanbul metro stations
Railway stations opened in 2020
Rapid transit stations under construction in Turkey